Daniel E. Ho is an American lawyer, currently the William Benjamin Scott and Luna M. Scott Professor of Law at Stanford Law School.

Education and training
Ho earned his B.A. degree at the University of California, Berkeley, his Ph.D. in government at Harvard University in 2004, and his J.D. degree from Yale Law School in 2005.

Professional experience
Ho clerked for Judge Stephen F. Williams, a judge on the United States Court of Appeals for the District of Columbia Circuit. He was also a postdoctoral fellow at the Institute for Quantitative Social Science at Harvard University.

Awards and recognition
Ho earned the John Bingham Hurlbut Award for Excellence in Teaching and was made a Senior Fellow at the Stanford Institute for Economic Policy Research

References

Living people
Year of birth missing (living people)
Stanford Law School faculty
American lawyers
University of California, Berkeley alumni
Harvard University alumni
Yale Law School alumni